Yang Hyeon-jong (Hangul: 양현종, Hanja: 梁玹種) (born March 1, 1988) is a Korean professional baseball pitcher for the Kia Tigers of the Korea Baseball Organization (KBO). He previously played in Major League Baseball (MLB) for the Texas Rangers. He made his MLB debut with Texas in 2021. He won the Korean Series in 2009 and 2017, and was the Korean Series MVP and KBO MVP in 2017 as well.

Amateur career
While attending Dongsung High School in Gwangju, South Korea, Yang was considered one of the nation's best high school left-handed pitchers along with Kim Kwang-Hyun. In April 2005, he participated in the 39th President's Cup National High School Baseball Championship and eventually led his school to their first championship since 1988, alongside fellow ace Han Ki-Joo. In April 2006, Yang was 2–1 with a 1.50 ERA at the 40th President's Cup National High School Baseball Championship, leading his team to runner-up as the team's ace. In August 2006, Yang led his team to runner-up at the 36th Phoenix Flag National High School Baseball Championship where he was named best pitcher, going 1–1 with an ERA of 0.90 and leading the tournament with 32 strikeouts.

In September 2006, Yang was selected for the South Korea junior national team alongside lefty rival Kim Kwang-Hyun that won the gold medal at the 2006 World Junior Baseball Championship in Cuba. In the round-robin, he pitched four scoreless innings against the Netherlands as a starting pitcher, racking up eight strikeouts. Yang started for South Korea in the semi-final game against Canada, facing future Mariners' pitching prospect Phillippe Aumont, and hurled three innings of two-hit, one-run ball with two strikeouts to help lead South Korea to a 6–1 victory. Yang posted a 1.04 ERA in 17.1 innings pitched in the tournament, and his 18 strikeouts were the second-highest total on the team after fellow left-hander Kim Kwang-Hyun (22 strikeouts). Yang was named to the All-Star team as the best left-handed pitcher.

Professional career

Kia Tigers
Upon graduation from Dongsung High School, Yang was selected by the Kia Tigers in the 2nd round (1st pick, 9th overall) of the 2007 KBO Draft. He made his KBO debut on April 7, 2007, against the LG Twins at Jamsil Baseball Stadium in Seoul, coming from the bullpen, but allowed a solo home run in one inning pitched. He made his first start on April 12 against the Hyundai Unicorns and tossed 5.2 scoreless innings of four-hit ball. However, Yang struggled with his command and was never able to regain it to the level he had earlier in the season. At the end of May, Yang was eventually demoted to the reserve team of the Tigers. In August, the young left-hander came back to the Tigers first-team roster and pitched in relief of the Tigers' starters in the second half of the season. On September 29, 2007, Yang recorded his first professional win against the Hanwha Eagles in Daejeon, pitching five innings of two-hit, one-run ball as a starter. Yang finished his rookie season with a record of 1–2 and an ERA of 4.17 in 49.2 innings pitched, appearing in 31 games as a utility pitcher.

Yang had a disappointing sophomore season in 2008, slipping to 0–5 with a 5.83 ERA. He started the season as a starting pitcher, but struggled through five appearances with an ERA of 7.00 and was eventually relegated to the bullpen. Though frequently sent to the mound as a starter to fill a temporary void in the rotation during the season, Yang mainly pitched in relief for the Tigers, garnering 5 holds as a setup man.

In 2009, Yang had a career year. He was 9th in wins (12), 5th in ERA (3.15), 4th in strikeouts (139) and 12th in innings pitched (148.2), all of which were career bests.  On August 11, he had one of his best performances of his pro career, hurling 7.1 shutout innings in which he only allowed 5 hits with no walks and struck out 10 batters against the Lotte Giants. On November 14, Yang pitched as the starter for the Tigers in the 2009 KBO-NPB Club Championship game against the Yomiuri Giants. In that game, he allowed only three hits and one run and racked up 6 strikeouts in 5.2 innings.

In 2010, Yang's ERA rose over a full point to 4.25 and gave up the second-highest number of hits in the KBO league with 169, resulting in a .272 batting average against. However, he had four more wins than the previous year, posting a 16–8 record and striking out 145 batters. Yang was runner-up in wins and third in strikeouts among the KBO pitchers in the 2010 season. He pitched his first career complete game shutout against the Samsung Lions on June 2.

In 2011, Yang struggled, recording a 6.18 ERA and 7–9 record with 74 strikeouts. The next year, Yang recorded a 5.05 ERA with 26 strikeouts. In 2013 for the Tigers, Yang pitched to a 9–3 record and 3.10 ERA with 95 strikeouts in 104.2 innings of work. In 2014, Yang led the league with 16 wins on the season to go along with a 4.25 ERA.

Yang was posted to MLB in November 2014. However, the Tigers rejected the winning bid, feeling that it was too low. (It was reported that the Minnesota Twins or the Texas Rangers were possibly the highest bidders with a bid estimated at $1.5 million, though the exact details were never disclosed.) Yang returned to the Tigers for the following season. On July 2, 2015, Yang threw a one-hit shutout against the Doosan Bears, striking out 10 and allowing two walks. On the year, he recorded a 15–6 record and a 2.44 ERA. In 2016, Yang pitched to a 10–12 record and 3.68 ERA with 146 strikeouts.

Yang was named the most valuable player of the 2017 Korean Series and won the KBO League Most Valuable Player Award for the 2017 KBO League season. He had pitched to a 20–6 record and 3.44 ERA with 158 strikeouts. Yang re-signed with the Tigers for the 2018 on a one-year contract. He pitched to a 13–11 record and 4.15 ERA for the Tigers in 2018. In 2019 for the Tigers, Yang pitched in 29 games on the season, pitching to a 16–8 record with a 2.29 ERA and 163 strikeouts over 184.2 innings pitched. In 2020, Yang recorded a 11–10 record and 4.70 ERA with 149 strikeouts in 172.1 innings pitched.

Yang finished his tenure with the Tigers with an overall 147–95 record to go along with a 3.83 ERA and 1,673 strikeouts in 14 seasons with the club.

Texas Rangers
On January 30, 2021, it was announced that Yang had ended negotiations with the Tigers for a new contract in hopes of landing a major league contract in Major League Baseball (MLB). On February 12, 2021, Yang signed a minor league contract with the Texas Rangers organization that included an invitation to Spring Training. The deal also included a $1.3 million guarantee if Yang made it to MLB.

On April 26, 2021, Yang was selected to the 40-man roster and promoted to the major leagues for the first time. Yang struggled to an 0–3 record and 5.59 ERA in 8 appearances for the team before being designated for assignment on June 17. He was outrighted to the Triple-A Round Rock Express on June 19. After posting a 5.60 ERA with 42 strikeouts through 10 games for Round Rock, the Rangers selected Yang's contract on August 24. On August 30, Yang was returned to Triple-A Round Rock. On September 1, Yang was again selected to the active roster. Yang was again designated for assignment by the Rangers on September 15. Yang made 12 appearances for Texas, posting a 5.60 ERA with 25 strikeouts. On October 4, Yang elected free agency.

Kia Tigers (second stint)
On December 24, 2021, Yang returned to the Kia Tigers.

He achieved various milestone records, including the youngest 2,000 innings, the youngest 150 wins, 100 innings for nine consecutive seasons, 2,100 innings, 9,000 batters, 1,800 strikeouts, eight consecutive double-digit wins, three-digit strikeouts, and 170 innings.

However, it can be seen that the war based on statistics is 1.69, which is relatively lower than the superficial grade. The reason for this is, first of all, a slightly higher ERA of 3.85 in the pitching and hitting season. It is significantly lower than the ERA of 4.70 in the 2020 season before entering the U.S., and is ranked eighth among native starters who filled the 2022 season's regulatory innings, but it is a little higher considering that it is a pitching and hitting season. In addition, it can be seen that ERA+ or FIP+ has also been lowered due to the lack of pitching quality due to the situation where the ball is falling. There were not many home runs, but the fact that 141 strikeouts in the season are the minimum strikeouts in his season since 2013 is evidence of his poor pitching. Since Statistics War is based on runs, not earned runs, the fact that the non-recruiting runs are 11 points (13) will also have an impact. However, war has different calculation methods for each site and contains some parts that the player cannot control, so it is better to see it integrally with other records rather than blindly believing. However, even considering that, it cannot be denied that the figure of 1.69 is sluggish compared to the name value of Yang Hyeon-jong.

He set a milestone of 170 innings for the first eight consecutive seasons in the KBO League, making it clear that he played only two of the 30 games he started.

At the beginning of the season, he showed good performance enough to include the word aging curve, but he showed a poor and disappointing performance in the second half. This aspect was shown when Yang Hyun-jong was just taking over as a starting pitcher, but it is not known exactly why his physical strength has decreased as he gets older, but this part is expected to be supplemented next season.

International career
He represented South Korea at the 2010 Asian Games, 2014 Asian Games, 2017 World Baseball Classic, and 2018 Asian Games. He led the 2019 WBSC Premier12 tournament with 17 strikeouts.

See also 
 List of KBO career win leaders
 List of KBO career strikeout leaders

References

External links 

 Career statistics and player information from Korea Baseball Organization

1988 births
Living people
Asian Games gold medalists for South Korea
Asian Games medalists in baseball
Baseball players at the 2010 Asian Games
Baseball players at the 2014 Asian Games
Baseball players at the 2018 Asian Games
Kia Tigers players
KBO League pitchers
Korean Series MVPs
Major League Baseball pitchers
Major League Baseball players from South Korea
Medalists at the 2010 Asian Games
Medalists at the 2014 Asian Games
Medalists at the 2018 Asian Games
Round Rock Express players
South Korean expatriate baseball players in the United States
Sportspeople from Gwangju
Texas Rangers players
2017 World Baseball Classic players
2023 World Baseball Classic players